Battersea was a civil parish and metropolitan borough in the County of London, England. In 1965, the borough was abolished and its area combined with parts of the Metropolitan Borough of Wandsworth to form the London Borough of Wandsworth. The borough was administered from Battersea Town Hall on Lavender Hill. That building is now Battersea Arts Centre.

Ancient parish
As an ancient parish, Battersea was part of the hundred of Brixton and county of Surrey. It included the exclave of Penge.

Parish in the Metropolis
In 1855, under the Metropolis Management Act 1855, the civil responsibilities of the parish were passed to the Metropolitan Board of Works. The two parts of the parish were assigned to different districts by the act establishing the MBW: Battersea was included in the area of the Wandsworth District Board of Works and the hamlet of Penge in that of Lewisham District Board of Works. Penge became a civil parish in its own right in 1866.

On 25 March 1888, a separate vestry was formed as a local authority for The parish of Saint Mary Battersea excluding Penge. In 1889, the Local Government Act 1888 reconstituted the area of the Metropolitan Board of Works as the County of London, and Battersea was transferred from Surrey to the new county.

The population of the parish in 1896 was 165,115 and it had adopted the Public Libraries Act 1850 immediately upon obtaining local independence in 1888, with its own vestry. For electoral purposes, the parish was divided into four wards and had 120 elected vestrymen.

Metropolitan borough
In 1900, the London Government Act 1899 divided the County of London into twenty-eight metropolitan boroughs. The vestries and district boards were dissolved. The parish became the Metropolitan Borough of Battersea, with the borough council replacing the civil vestry.

The Metropolitan Borough included within its bounds Battersea, Battersea Park, Clapham Junction and parts of Wandsworth Common and Clapham Common.

In 1913, John Archer became mayor of the borough and the first black mayor in the capital.

Ecclesiastical parish 
The ancient parish, dedicated to St Mary, was in the Diocese of Winchester until 1877, then the Diocese of Rochester until 1905, and then finally in the Diocese of Southwark. From 1851, as the population of Battersea increased, a number of new parishes were formed:
 St George, Nine Elms in 1853
 Christ Church, Battersea Park in 1861 
 St John, York Road Battersea in 1863
 St Philip, Queen's Road, Battersea in 1870
 Church of the Ascension, Lavender Hill in 1871
 St Saviour, Battersea Park Road in 1872
 St Peter, Plough Road, Battersea in 1876
 St Mark, Battersea Rise in 1883
 All Saints, Queen's Road, Battersea Park in 1884 
 St Michael, Wandsworth Common in 1884 
 St Andrew, Stockdale Road, Battersea in 1886 
 St Stephen, Battersea Bridge Road in 1887 
 St Barnabas, Clapham Common in 1895
 St Luke, Ramsden Road, Battersea in 1901
 St Bartholomew, Wickersley Road, Battersea in 1906

A number of new parishes were also formed within the detached part of Battersea parish, the hamlet of Penge:
 St John the Evangelist, Penge in 1851
 St Paul, Penge in 1869
 Holy Trinity, Anerley Road, Penge in 1873
 Christ Church, Penge in 1886

Coat of arms
In 1901, the borough adopted an unofficial coat of arms, consisting of a shield vertically divided blue and white, the division line being indented (in heraldry-speak Party per pale indented azure and argent). This design was taken from a flag dating from 1803. On top of the shield was a dove bearing an olive branch. The Latin motto was Non Mihi, Non Tibi, Sed Nobis, or "Neither for myself, nor for yourself, but for us".

In 1955, the borough received an official grant from the College of Arms, based on the old device. The colours in the shield were reversed, and a bordure or heraldic border added. The bordure consisted of silver and blue waves, representative of the River Thames, and bore sixteen gold stars for the sixteen wards of the borough. The new crest on top of the helm was the dove of the 1901 design, with the addition of sprigs of lavender, for the old lavender fields of the area, and Lavender Hill, the main road of Battersea. The old motto was retained.

Population and area
The population recorded in the Census was:

Battersea Vestry 1801–1899

Metropolitan Borough 1900–1961

Politics

The first election to the council was on 1 November 1900, with the Progressive Party taking control of the new borough. They retained power until 1909, when the Municipal Reform Party (allied to the Conservatives) gained a majority. The Progressives regained the council in 1912, holding power until 1919 when the Labour Party gained control. In 1931 the borough come under Municipal Reform control again. Labour regained power in 1934, retaining it for the rest of the borough's existence.

Elections of the whole council were held every three years. Elections were cancelled during the two world wars (1914–1918 and 1939–1945). The 1952 election was postponed for a year so that it did not clash with elections to the London County Council. The number of councillors returned at each election was as follows:.

Local elections

No Municipal Reform candidates were nominated after 1946, and Conservative candidates were nominated at local elections for the first time.

Wards
From 1900 to 1949 the borough was divided into nine wards, returning either three, six or nine councillors:
Bolingbroke (6 councillors)
Broomwood (6)
Church (6)
Latchmere (6)
Nine Elms (9)
Park (6)
St John (3)
Shaftesbury (6)
Winstanley (6)

In 1949 the wards were redrawn, with fourteen wards returning three to five councillors each:
Bolingbroke (3)
Broomwood (3)
Church (4)
Latchmere (4)
Lavender (3)
Newtown (3)
Nightingale (5)
Nine Elms (3)
Park (4)
Queenstown (4)
St John (4)
Shaftesbury (3)
Stormont (3)
Thornton (3)
Vicarage (3)
Winstanley (3)

The latest ward to be redrawn was Fairfield ward, with three councillors.

Parliamentary constituencies
For elections to parliament the borough was originally part of the parliamentary borough of Battersea and Clapham, which consisted of two divisions, Battersea
and Clapham.

In 1918 the metropolitan borough was divided into two constituencies:
Battersea North (Church, Latchmere, Nine Elms and Park wards) and
Battersea South (Bolingbroke, Broomwood, St John, Shaftesbury and Winstanley wards)

The boundaries of the two constituencies were adjusted in 1949 to reflect the redrawn borough wards:
Battersea North (Church, Latchmere, Newtown, Nine Elms, Park, Queenstown, Vicarage and Winstanley wards)
Battersea South (Bolingbroke, Broomwood, Lavender, Nightingale, St John, Shaftesbury, Stormont and Thornton wards)

The constituencies continued unchanged until 1983 when the Battersea constituency largely succeeded these two.

References
Notes

Bibliography
"The London Manual 1899–1900" edited by Robert Donald (Edward Lloyd Ltd., 1899)

Further reading
 

Metropolitan boroughs of the County of London
History of the London Borough of Wandsworth
Parishes governed by vestries (Metropolis) 
Parishes united into districts (Metropolis)
Former civil parishes in London
1900 establishments in the United Kingdom
1965 disestablishments in the United Kingdom

Districts abolished by the London Government Act 1963
Metropolitan Borough of